Sosie Ruth Bacon (born March 15, 1992) is an American actress. Her first role was playing 10-year-old Emily in the film Loverboy (2005), which was directed by her father, Kevin Bacon and stars her mother, Kyra Sedgwick. James Duff, producer of The Closer, was compelled by Bacon's performance in Loverboy to suggest that she play the role of Brenda Leigh Johnson's niece Charlie in season five of the series. Although her parents were opposed to her being involved in acting, she accepted the role and appeared in four episodes alongside her mother, who played the role of Chief Johnson. Bacon portrayed the character Skye Miller in the TV series 13 Reasons Why. In 2022, she starred in the horror film Smile.

Early life 
Sosie Bacon was born in 1992 to actors Kevin Bacon and Kyra Sedgwick. Bacon was provided with a "fairly ordinary" upbringing, according to producer James Duff, and her parents were determined that she not follow them into acting.

Career 
While directing Loverboy, Kevin Bacon decided to cast Sosie in the film. Asked about the choice, he said that he made the decision as a director, not as a father, because he believed his daughter was perfect for the role, and "Sosie was cool. She kind of got it out of her system. She said 'Oh, that was fun—now I'm going back to school'." Sosie portrayed the main character Emily in a flashback, while the adult Emily was portrayed by Sosie's mother Kyra Sedgwick. As Emily, Sosie sang an a cappella version of the David Bowie song "Life on Mars?", that was described in a review from The New York Times as "grotesquely funny". Her brother, Travis Bacon, was cast in a smaller role in the film. Kevin praised Sosie's work on Loverboy, but said that he would not be encouraging her to pursue acting further.

Her performance in Loverboy is what James Duff, the producer of The Closer, has said first prompted him to suggest that Bacon begin acting. Duff had wanted to write her into the series since she was 12 years old, according to Sedgwick, who plays the role of Deputy Chief Brenda Leigh Johnson on the show. However, Sedgwick was opposed to the idea, insistent on Sosie's not getting involved with acting. Duff said that he eventually was able to get her parents to agree to her having a brief role in the series provided it did not interfere with her education. He described the agreement as being "more like a treaty negotiation" than an arrangement. Sedgwick's version of events was different. She said that she had told Duff she would discuss it with her husband, but that Duff went directly to Sosie, who accepted the role, and at that point, her mother said, "there was no turning back". The role lasted for four episodes.

Following her role on The Closer, Bacon began studying at Brown University and has studied at musical theatre company CAP21. She joined the cast of Fiction in Photographs in 2012, an off-Broadway musical by Dan Mills and Randy Redd.

On November 21, 2013, Bacon was crowned Miss Golden Globe 2014. Chosen each year by the Hollywood Foreign Press Association, Miss Golden Globe assists with the Globes ceremony and is typically the daughter of Hollywood celebrities.

Sosie was cast in the leading female role of the independent film Off Season (2014), opposite Chance Kelly. Following up her role in 13 Reasons Why, Bacon was cast in Here and Now, a 2018-debuting HBO family drama series from award-winning writer-producer Alan Ball, as Kristen, the youngest daughter of a couple played by Tim Robbins and Holly Hunter.
In HBO’s 2021 limited series Mare of Easttown, she was cast as Carrie Layden. 
She starred in the 2022 horror film Smile as the protagonist, Dr. Rose Cotter.

Filmography

Film

Television

References

External links
 

1992 births
Living people
21st-century American actresses
Actresses from New York City
American child actresses
American film actresses
American television actresses
Brown University alumni
Jewish American actresses
People from Los Angeles
Sedgwick family